No Defense may refer to:
 No Defense (1929 film), an American romantic drama film
 No Defense (1921 film), an American silent drama film